Artichoke oil is extracted from the seeds of the Cynara cardunculus (cardoon). It is similar in composition to safflower and sunflower oil. The fatty acid composition of artichoke oil is:

Recently, artichoke oil has attracted some attention as a possible source of biodiesel.

References

Vegetable oils